Buckleria madecassea is a moth of the family Pterophoridae that is known from Madagascar.

References

Moths described in 1994
Endemic fauna of Madagascar
Oxyptilini
Lepidoptera of Madagascar
Moths of Madagascar
Moths of Africa